La Patère Rose was a Canadian francophone electro-pop group formed in 2003 in Sherbrooke, Quebec. The band was composed of keyboardist Roboto (Thomas Hébert), drummer Kilojules (Julien Harbec) and singer-pianist Fanny Bloom (Fanny Grosjean).

The band played at the FrancoFolies in 2008; their song Back Yard Souvenir was named best song at the Francouvertes.

The band then recorded their self-titled debut album and began touring in Quebec. The album was a longlisted nominee for the 2009 Polaris Music Prize.

The band later performed at the South By SouthWest festival in Austin, Texas.

In 2011, La Patère Rose disbanded after playing a farewell show at Cabaret du Mile End.

Discography 
2009:  La Patère Rose
2010:  Waikiki

Awards 
 2008 - Francouvertes Grand Prize

See also

Music of Canada
List of bands from Canada

References

Musical groups established in 2003
Musical groups disestablished in 2011
Canadian indie pop groups
2003 establishments in Quebec
2011 disestablishments in Quebec